Susan Joan Wood (August 22, 1948 – November 12, 1980) was a Canadian literary critic, professor, author and science fiction fan and editor. She was born in Ottawa, Ontario.

Biography 

Wood discovered science fiction fandom while she was studying at Carleton University in the 1960s. Wood met fellow fan Mike Glicksohn of Toronto at Boskone VI in 1969. Wood and Glicksohn married in 1970 (she subsequently sometimes published as Susan Wood Glicksohn), and they published the fanzine Energumen together until 1973. Energumen won the 1973 Hugo for Best Fanzine. Wood and Glicksohn were co-guests of honor at the 1975 World Science Fiction Convention. Wood published a great deal of trenchant criticism of the field, both in fanzines and in more formal venues. She received three Hugo Awards for Best Fan Writer, in 1974, 1977, and 1981. In 1976 she was instrumental in organizing the first feminist panel at a science fiction convention, at MidAmericon (that year's WorldCon). The reaction to this helped lead to the founding of A Women's APA and of WisCon.

Wood earned a B.A. (1969) and an M.A. (1970) from Carleton University and a Ph.D. (1975) from the University of Toronto. She joined the English Department at the University of British Columbia in 1975 and taught Canadian literature, science fiction and children's literature. She was the Vancouver editor of the Pacific Northwest Review of Books (Jan.-Oct. 1978) and also edited the special science fiction/fantasy issue of Room of One's Own. She wrote numerous articles and book reviews that were published in books and academic journals, while continuing to write for fanzines.

While teaching courses in science fiction at UBC, one of her students was William Gibson; his first published story, "Fragments of a Hologram Rose", was originally written as an assignment in the class.

Death and legacy
Wood died November 12, 1980. Archives of some of Wood's papers are available in the library of the University of British Columbia. A memorial scholarship fund at Carleton University was established after her death, funded in part by donations from science fiction fandom (and from the sale of parts of her collection of science fiction art).

References

External links
 
Complete archives of Susan Wood's fanzines Aspidistra and Amor, together with the posthumous anthology of her writings The Best of Susan Wood
Susan Wood papers at the University of British Columbia via Internet Archive
Friends of Susan Wood Facebook group

1948 births
1980 deaths
Canadian academics of women's studies
Canadian literary critics
Women literary critics
Canadian science fiction
Carleton University alumni
Hugo Award-winning fan writers
Science fiction academics
Science fiction critics
Science fiction editors
Canadian speculative fiction critics
Canadian speculative fiction editors
University of Toronto alumni
Academic staff of the University of British Columbia
Writers from Ottawa
20th-century Canadian essayists
Women speculative fiction editors
Canadian women essayists